Teladoma astigmatica is a moth in the family Cosmopterigidae. It is found in North America, where it has been recorded from western Texas and southern New Mexico.

References

Natural History Museum Lepidoptera generic names catalog

Cosmopteriginae